Jane Stewart  is a Canadian neuroscientist who has been active in the fields of psychology, psychiatry, and psychopharmacology. She is a professor emerita at Concordia University in Montreal, Canada.

Career
Stewart earned a Bachelor of Arts degree in psychology and biology from Queen's University in 1956, and PhD in psychology in 1959 from the University of London, England. She then started working for Ayerst Pharmaceuticals in Montreal and subsequently joined Concordia University in 1962, where she served as chair of the Department of Psychology (1969–1974) and director of the Center for Studies in Behavioral Neurobiology (1990–1997). She served on many grant review committees and on the editorial boards of 11 peer-reviewed scientific journals.

Research
Stewart has made seminal contributions to different areas of research, such as conditioned drug effects, the motivational effects of drugs, circadian rhythms, antidepressant and antipsychotic drug action, and sexual behavior.

Honors
Stewart was awarded an honorary degree from Queen's University and is a Fellow of the American Association for the Advancement of Science, the American Psychological Association, the Canadian Psychological Association, and the Royal Society of Canada. She also received the highest civilian honor in her country, being appointed Officer in the Order of Canada in 2007. A special issue of the journal Biological Psychiatry was dedicated to her on the occasion of her retirement in 2008.

Significant papers
 (cited over 1300 times)
 (cited over 600 times)
 (cited over 400 times)
 (cited over 350 times)
 (cited over 300 times)

References

Living people
Officers of the Order of Canada
Canadian neuroscientists
Canadian women neuroscientists
Canadian women psychologists
Year of birth missing (living people)
Queen's University at Kingston alumni
Alumni of the University of London
Fellows of the Royal Society of Canada
Academic staff of Concordia University